were officials of the Tokugawa shogunate in Edo period Japan.  This office was created on July 3, 1859, when five fudai daimyō were appointed.  Conventional interpretations have construed these Japanese titles as "commissioner" or "overseer" or "governor."

This bakufu title identifies an official responsible for administration of the port of Kanagawa (modern Yokohama.  The numbers of men holding the title concurrently would vary over time, fluctuating from as few as five in number in 1859 to as many as nine at one time.

This office was often held concurrently with the office of gaikoku-bugyō.

List of Kanagawa bugyō

 Mizuno Tadanori, (1859).
 Takemoto Masao (1859-1860, 1861-1862).
 Matsudaira Yasunao (1860-1863).
 Abe Masato (1864-1866).
 Hayakawa Hisatake

See also
 Bugyō

Notes

References
 Beasley, William G. (1955).  Select Documents on Japanese Foreign Policy, 1853-1868. London: Oxford University Press. [reprinted by RoutledgeCurzon, London, 2001.   (cloth)]

Government of feudal Japan
Officials of the Tokugawa shogunate